Penstemon fruticiformis is a species of penstemon known by the common name Death Valley beardtongue. It is native to the western United States, where it is found growing in rocky scrub, woodlands, deserts and mountains of eastern California and western Nevada. It is known from scattered occurrences around Death Valley, and only one of the two varieties occurs on the Nevada side of the border. It is a perennial herb producing spreading, multibranched, hairless and waxy stems 30 to 60 centimeters tall. The thick leaves are generally lance-shaped, folded and rolled, and up to 6.5 centimeters in length. The inflorescence produces several white or pale pinkish-lavender flowers between 2 and 3 centimeters long. The mouth of the flower bears a stark, dark line on each of its three lower lobes, nectar guides for its pollinators which probably include native bumble bees.

References

External links
Jepson Manual Treatment
Photo gallery

fruticiformis
Flora of California
Flora of Nevada
Flora without expected TNC conservation status